The Central National de Trabajadores de Panama is a national trade union center in Panama. It is affiliated with the World Federation of Trade Unions.

References

Trade unions in Panama
World Federation of Trade Unions